Tulasi is a 2007 Indian Telugu-language action drama film, produced by D.Suresh Babu on Suresh Productions banner and directed by Boyapati Srinu. It stars Venkatesh, Nayantara in lead roles and music is composed by Devi Sri Prasad.

Plot
Parvataneni Tulasi Ram is a native of Rayalaseema. As his region is well known for factional feuds, his father Dasaratha Ramayya keeps him away in Hyderabad, gets him educated, and makes him an architect. Once, he comes across Vasundhara and later marries her. When Vasu turns pregnant, Tulasi takes her to their native place. Tulasi turns violent when a rival faction pushes his father. Later, the factional feuds continue to haunt him. When Vasu's brother Harsha dies in the attack by factionists, Vasu could not digest the violence and deserts Tulasi with their son Harsha. Later, Tulasi learns that Harsha has a blood clot in his brain, and it may cause a hemorrhage. With the help of Dr. Surekha, Tulasi summons specialists from abroad to get Harsha operated on. When everything is ready for the surgery, Veeranna, a gangster takes away the boy as both of his sons were killed by Tulasi. In the climax, Tulasi kills Veeranna to save his son's life. The film ends with Vasu and Tulasi reuniting.

Cast

 Venkatesh as Parvataneni Tulasi Ram
 Nayantara as Vasundhara
 Master Atulith (Child) as Harsha
 Ashish Vidyarthi as Veeranna, an underworld gangster
 Rahul Dev as Basavaraju
 Vijaykumar as Parvataneni Dasaratha Ramayya
 Sivaji as Harsha, Vasu's brother
 Ali
 Ramya Krishnan as Dr. Surekha
 Ahuti Prasad as Raghavendra, Tulasi's uncle
 Subbaraju as Ravi, Veeranna's elder son
 Riyaz Khan as Shankar, Veeranna's younger son
 Jhansi as Kokapet Aunty
 Jaya Prakash Reddy as Chandrayya, Ramayya's rival
 Paruchuri Venkateswara Rao
 Raghu Babu
 Ravi Babu
 Tanikella Bharani
 Naramalli Sivaprasad
 Uttej
 Narsing Yadav
 Banerjee
 Bandla Ganesh
 Sameer
 Chitram Seenu
 Dr. Siva Prasad
 Siva Parvathi
 Shravan
 Tarzan
 Sravani
 Devisri
 Saraswatamma
 Shriya in a guest appearance in the song "Ne Chuk Chuk Bandini"

Soundtrack

Music composed by Devi Sri Prasad. Music released on ADITYA Music Company. Audio of Tulasi was launched at a function arranged in the song set at Rama Naidu studios in the evening of 22 September 2007. K. Raghavendra Rao, D. Ramanaidu and KL Narayana attended this function as guests. K. Raghavendra Rao released the audio cassette and gave the first unit to D. Ramanaidu. D. Ramanaidu released the audio CD and gave the first unit to Shriya Saran.

Release
The film released with 290 prints worldwide, in 312 screens in India which includes 20 screens in Andhra Pradesh, 21 screens in Karnataka and 7 screens in Tamil Nadu. The film had a 50-day run in 225 centres and was declared a super hit. It was later dubbed and released in Tamil and Malayalam with the same title and in Hindi as The Real Man Hero.

Box office
 The film has undergone the theatrical business of 12 crores and grossed 32 crores during its full run and got distributor share of 18.43 crores and emerged as Super Hit
 It has grossed Rs. 120 million in 12 days. 
TV rights sold for Rs. 20 million.
 It is the first Telugu film to complete 50 days direct in 225 theatres across Andhra.

Awards
Jhansi won Nandi Award for Best Female Comedian

References

External links

2007 films
2000s Telugu-language films
Indian action drama films
Films directed by Boyapati Srinu
Films scored by Devi Sri Prasad
2000s masala films
2007 action drama films
Suresh Productions films